Hopper House may refer to:

in the United States
(by state, then city)

Hopper Court, Hopkinsville, Kentucky, listed on the National Register of Historic Places (NRHP) in Christian County, Kentucky
Ackerman-Hopper House, Glen Rock, New Jersey, listed on the National Register of Historic Places in Bergen County, New Jersey
Andrew H. Hopper House, Glen Rock, New Jersey, listed on the National Register of Historic Places in Bergen County, New Jersey
Garret Hopper House, Glen Rock, New Jersey, listed on the National Register of Historic Places in Bergen County, New Jersey
Hendrick Hopper House, Glen Rock, New Jersey, NRHP-listed
John Hopper House, Hackensack, New Jersey, NRHP-listed
Terhune-Hopper House (Ho-Ho-Kus, New Jersey), listed on the National Register of Historic Places in Bergen County, New Jersey
Hopper-Van Horn House, Mahwah, New Jersey, NRHP-listed
Demarest-Hopper House, Oakland, New Jersey, listed on the National Register of Historic Places in Bergen County, New Jersey
Hopper House (Saddle River, New Jersey), NRHP-listed
Hopper House (Upper Saddle River, New Jersey), NRHP-listed
Hopper-Goetschius House, Upper Saddle River, New Jersey, NRHP-listed
Terhune-Hopper House (Upper Saddle River, New Jersey), listed on the National Register of Historic Places in Bergen County, New Jersey
Van Riper-Hopper House, Wayne, New Jersey, NRHP-listed
Isaac T. Hopper House, New York, New York, NRHP-listed
Edward Hopper Birthplace and Boyhood Home, Nyack, New York, NRHP-listed
Hopper-Snyder Homestead, Watsontown, Pennsylvania, NRHP-listed

See also
Terhune-Hopper House (disambiguation)